Even though Africa is the second largest continent by size and population, its airlines account for only about 6% of the world's air traffic, as most of it is being carried out by foreign air lines.

This is a list of largest airlines in Africa. It is ranked by number of transported passengers.

By passengers carried (millions)

Notes
 Based on Fiscal Year ending 7 Jul.
 Based on Fiscal Year ending 31 Mar. Includes figures for Mango.
 Includes figures for Air Sinai and EgyptAir Express.
 Includes figures for Royal Air Maroc Express.
 Includes figures for Tunisair Express.
 Based on Fiscal Year ending 30 Jun. Includes figures for Jambojet.
 Based on Fiscal Year ending 30 Jun.

See also
List of airlines of Africa
List of defunct airlines of Africa
List of the busiest airports in Africa by passenger traffic
List of largest airlines in Asia
List of largest airlines in Europe
List of largest airlines in North America
List of largest airlines in Oceania
List of largest airlines in South America

References

Africa
Airlines of Africa
 Largest